Michał Marciak (born 16 March 1981 in Kraków) is Associate Professor of History at Jagiellonian University since 2018, specializing in Jewish studies. He has a MA in history (2007), a MA in theology (2007), and received his PhD in 2012 from the Faculty of Humanities of the University of Leiden.

Selected publications
A selection of Marciak's works:
 
 Pirowski, Tomasz, Michał Marciak, and Marcin Sobiech. 2021. "Potentialities and Limitations of Research on VHRS Data: Alexander the Great’s Military Camp at Gaugamela on the Navkur Plain in Kurdish Iraq as a Test Case" Remote Sensing 13, no. 5: 904. https://doi.org/10.3390/rs13050904 
 MARCIAK, Michał. The Upper Tigris Region between Rome, Iran, and Armenia. ELECTRUM, 2021, Volume 28, p. 151-161, lip. 2021. ISSN 2084-3909. Available at: <https://www.ejournals.eu/electrum/2021/Volume-28/art/19458/>. Date accessed: 02 lip. 2021 doi:https://doi.org/10.4467/20800909EL.21.011.13369.
 Marciak, M. (2019): Idumea and the Idumeans in Josephus’ Retelling of the Bible, Revue Biblique 126, 235-253
 Comfort, A., Marciak, M. (2018): How did the Persian king of kings get his wine? The upper Tigris in antiquity (700 BCE to 636 CE), Archaeopress Publishing Ltd., Oxford, UK, pp. IV, 147. 
 Marciak, M. (2018): Roman Adiabene? Concerning the Origin of a Historical and Cultural Misconception, in: C.S. Sommer, S. Matešic (eds.), Limes XXIII. Proceedings of the 23rd International Congress of Roman Frontier Studies Ingolstadt 2015. Akten des 23. Internationalen Limeskongresses in Ingolstadt 2015. Beiträge zum Welterbe  Limes Sonderband 4 (Bad Homburg v.d.H. 2018), 668-671.
 Marciak, M.(2017): Sophene, Gordyene, and Adiabene: The Three Regna Minora of  Northern Mesopotamia between East and West, Brill Publishers: Impact of Empire 26, Leiden – Boston.
 Marciak, M. 2016: The Site of Tigranokerta. Status Quaestionis, Acta Antiqua  Academiae Scientiarum Hungaricae 56, 293-314.
 Marciak, M., Wójcikowski, R. (2016): Images of Kings of Adiabene: Numismatic and Sculptural Evidence, Iraq [Journal of the British Institute for the Study of Iraq] 78, 79-101 
 Marciak, M. (2014): Izates, Helena, and Monobazos of Adiabene. A Study on Literary Traditions and History, Harrassowitz: Philippika 66, Wiesbaden

References

Academic staff of Jagiellonian University
Leiden University alumni
Judaic scholars
21st-century Polish historians
1981 births

Living people

People from Kraków